Kohautia is a genus of flowering plants in the family Rubiaceae. They are native to tropical areas of Asia, Africa, and Madagascar. Thirty-one species are known. The type species for the genus is Kohautia senegalensis.

Kohautia was named by Adelbert von Chamisso and Diederich von Schlechtendal in 1829. This generic name honors Franz Kohaut (d. 1822), a plant collector who worked in West Africa for the botanist Franz Sieber (1789-1844).

Species
The following species are accepted in the genus Kohautia:

Kohautia amatymbica 
Kohautia angolensis 
Kohautia aspera 
Kohautia australiensis 
Kohautia azurea 
Kohautia caespitosa 
Kohautia coccinea 
Kohautia confusa 
Kohautia cynanchica 
Kohautia dolichostyla 
Kohautia euryantha 
Kohautia gracilis 
Kohautia gracillima 
Kohautia grandiflora 
Kohautia huillensis 
Kohautia kimuenzae 
Kohautia microflora 
Kohautia nagporensis 
Kohautia pappii 
Kohautia platyphylla 
Kohautia pleiocaulis 
Kohautia quartiniana 
Kohautia ramosissima 
Kohautia retrorsa 
Kohautia socotrana 
Kohautia subverticillata 
Kohautia tenuis

References

External links
 Kohautia At: Search Page At: World Checklist of Rubiaceae At: Index by Team At: Projects At: Science Directory At: Scientific Research and Data At: Kew Gardens
 Kohautia At:Index Nominum Genericorum At: References At: NMNH Department of Botany
 Kohautia In: Linnaea, volume 4 At: Linnaea At: Titles At: Botanicus

 
Rubiaceae genera
Taxa named by Adelbert von Chamisso
Taxonomy articles created by Polbot